2009 Kawasaki Frontale season

Competitions

Player statistics

Other pages
 J. League official site

Kawasaki Frontale
Kawasaki Frontale seasons